This is a list of Turkish Navy patrol vessels that have served past and present, from 10 July 1920 to present.

Torpedo boats

Hamidiye class 

Hamidiye-class torpedo boat:

Akhisar class 

Akhisar-class torpedo boat:

Antalya class 

Antalya-class torpedo boat

Demirhisar class 

Demirhisar-class torpedo boat

Motor Torpedo Boat

MTB-1 - MTB-10

Patrol vessels 

Harbour Defence Motor Launch

ML-1 - ML-7

Fairmile B motor launch

AB-1 - AB-8

Ex-US Auk class 

Ex- Royal Navy Auk class:

Ex-British Bathurst class 

Ex- Royal Australian Navy Bathurst class corvette:

Ex-British Bangor class 

Ex- Royal Canadian Navy :

Ex-US PC type  

Hisar class patrol vessel (Ex- US Navy  PC-1638-class submarine chaser):

Spanish Lazaga class 

Light version of Spanish Lazaga-class fast attack craft:

Ex-US PGM-71 class 

AB-21-class gunboat (Ex- US Navy PGM-71-class motor gunboat):

Ex-USCG 83-footer cutter type 

Ex- USCG "83-footer" cutter type

AB-25 class 

AB-25 class (Türk tipi avcı botu):

New type patrol boat

Fast attack crafts

Doğan class 

Doğan class MAS:

Bora, Kasırga, Şimşek, Tayfun, Yıldırım

Ex-West German Nasty class 

Ex West German Nasty-class (Klasse 152), Norwegian Nasty type patrol boat):

Ex-West German Jaguar class 

Ex West German Jaguar-class fast attack craft, Klasse 140:

Kartal class 

Kartal-class fast attack craft (ex  West German Zobel-class fast attack, Klasse 142):

Ex-US Asheville class 

Yıldırım-class fast attack craft (Ex- US Navy Asheville-class gunboat):

Doğan class 

Doğan-class fast attack craft (version of  Lürssen Werft FPB-57):

Rüzgar class 

Rüzgar-class fast attack craft (version of  Lürssen Werft FPB-57):

Yıldız class 

Yıldız-class fast attack craft (version of  Lürssen Werft FPB-57):

Kılıç class 

Kılıç-class fast attack craft ( Lürssen Werft):

Kılıç II class 
Kılıç II-class fast attack craft ( Lürssen Werft):

Sources

External links 

 Serhat Guvenc, "Building a Republican Navy in Turkey: 1924-1939", International Journal of Naval History
 Hücumbot Filosu Komutanlığı Tarihçesi
 Refakat ve Karakol Filosu Komodoruğu
 Unofficial Homepage of Turkish Navy

Turkish Navy
Patrol vessels of the Turkish Navy
Patrol vessels
Lists of ships of Turkey